Idris Ibragimovich Umayev (born 15 January 1999) is a Russian football player who plays for Kazakhstani club Aktobe on loan from Akhmat Grozny.

Club career
Umayev made his debut for the main squad of Akhmat Grozny on 26 September 2018 in a Russian Cup game against FC SKA-Khabarovsk. He came on as a late substitute in extra time and scored the decisive penalty kick that won the penalty shoot-out for Akhmat.

On 31 January 2019, Umayev was sent on loan to the Lithuanian A Lyga club Palanga until 30 June 2019. IN 14 A lyga matches scored 7 goal and made one assist.

On 10 July 2019, Umayev joined FC Khimki on loan for the 2019–20 season. He made his Russian Football National League debut for Khimki on 13 July 2019 in a game against FC Avangard Kursk.

Umayev made his Russian Premier League debut for FC Akhmat Grozny on 9 August 2020 in a game against FC Arsenal Tula, as a starter. On 12 October 2020, Umayev moved to Chayka Peschanokopskoye on loan.

On 31 July 2021, Shakhter Karagandy announced the signing of Umayev. On the same day, Akhmat announced that the transfer is a loan until the end of 2021. On 8 September 2022, Umayev moved on loan to Yenisey Krasnoyarsk. On 22 February 2023, Umayev moved on a new loan to FC Aktobe in Kazakhstan.

Personal life
His older brother Rasul Umayev is a goalkeeper formerly under contract with Akhmat Grozny.

Honours
Individual
 A Lyga Young Player of the Month: April 2019

Career statistics

References

External links
 
 

1999 births
People from Groznensky District
Sportspeople from Chechnya
Russian people of Chechen descent
Living people
Russian footballers
Russia youth international footballers
Association football forwards
FC Akhmat Grozny players
FK Palanga players
FC Khimki players
FC Chayka Peschanokopskoye players
FC Shakhter Karagandy players
FC Yenisey Krasnoyarsk players
FC Aktobe players
A Lyga players
Russian Premier League players
Russian First League players
Russian Second League players
Kazakhstan Premier League players
Russian expatriate footballers
Expatriate footballers in Lithuania
Russian expatriate sportspeople in Lithuania
Expatriate footballers in Kazakhstan
Russian expatriate sportspeople in Kazakhstan